The U.S. Chemical Safety and Hazard Investigation Board (USCSB), generally referred to as the Chemical Safety Board or CSB, is an independent U.S. federal agency charged with investigating industrial chemical accidents. Headquartered in Washington, D.C., the agency's board members are appointed by the president and confirmed by the United States Senate.  The CSB conducts root cause investigations of chemical accidents at fixed industrial facilities.

History 
The U.S. Chemical Safety Board is authorized by the Clean Air Act Amendments of 1990 and became operational in January 1998. The Senate legislative history states: "The principal role of the new chemical safety board is to investigate accidents to determine the conditions and circumstances which led up to the event and to identify the cause or causes so that similar events might be prevented." Congress gave the CSB a unique statutory mission and provided in law that no other agency or executive branch official may direct the activities of the Board. Following the successful model of the National Transportation Safety Board and the Department of Transportation, Congress directed that the CSB's investigative function be completely independent of the rulemaking, inspection, and enforcement authorities of the Environmental Protection Agency and Occupational Safety and Health Administration. Congress recognized that Board investigations would identify chemical hazards that were not addressed by those agencies. Also similarly to the NTSB, the CSB performs "investigations [that] identify the root causes of chemical incidents and share these findings broadly across industries to prevent future incidents."

Following criticism from lawmakers and allegations of mismanagement, the former chairman of the CSB, Rafael Moure-Eraso, resigned in March 2015. He was replaced by Vanessa Allen Sutherland in August 2015. Sutherland resigned with two years left in her five-year term after the Trump administration proposed shutting down the CSB as part of the 2019 United States federal budget which ultimately would not occur.

Investigations 

The USCSB has investigated many of the most devastating industrial accidents in the U.S. since its inception. It is known for its highly detailed and technically oriented post mortem analyses of individual incidents, as well as its transparent public relations practices. The latter include at length reconstructions of an incident, alongside root cause analysis and subsequent recommendations the Board has made; unusually for a governmental agency, they are often attended by a video form safety report, with careful narration and high quality computer graphics. Their videos are narrated by Sheldon Smith. The agency publishes its videos on a public YouTube channel, which  has over 250 thousand subscribers.

In the mid to late 2000s, many of the USCSB's videos have centered on explosive dust hazards, and OSHA's response to USCSB's recommendations on the issue. Of the 8 investigations concerning explosions and fires caused by combustible dust conducted by the USCSB, 5 of them had their final report released from 2004 to 2009.

Below is a list of the USCSB's notable investigations:

 Texas City Refinery explosion, March 2005
 Xcel Energy Cabin Creek Hydroelectric Plant Fire, October 2007
 Port Wentworth Imperial Sugar plant explosion, February 2008
 Deepwater Horizon explosion, 2010
 Chevron Refinery fire, August 6, 2012
 West, TX, Fertilizer Fire and Explosion, April 17, 2013
 Husky Superior Refinery Explosion and Fire, April 26, 2018
 Philadelphia Energy Solutions refinery explosion, June 21, 2019

See also 
 Occupational Safety and Health Administration
 United States Environmental Protection Agency

Notes

External links
 
 

Independent agencies of the United States government
1998 establishments in Washington, D.C.
Chemical safety
United States Chemical Safety and Hazard Investigation Board